Compsoctena talarodes is a moth in the family Eriocottidae. It was described by Edward Meyrick in 1927. It is found in Tanzania and Zimbabwe.

References

Moths described in 1927
Compsoctena
Lepidoptera of Tanzania
Insects of Zimbabwe